Ted R. Rice was an American jockey. He rode the winning horse Paul Jones in the 1920 Kentucky Derby. Rice received a $5,000 bonus from owner Capt. Ral Parr for winning the race.

Ted Rice died after a fall from a horse on October 6, 1923. To add to the tragedy, his mother was in the stands.

References

Year of birth missing
1923 deaths
American jockeys
American Champion jockeys
Jockeys who died while racing